Matthew Marks may refer to:

 Matthew Marks Gallery, an art gallery in New York City
 Matthew Robinson Marks (1834–1911), American politician, mayor of Orlando